French electronic music is a panorama of French music that employs electronic musical instruments and electronic music technology in its production.

Notable early French artists and composers in electronic music include Maurice Martenot, the inventor of the Ondes Martenot in 1928, and Pierre Schaeffer, the developer of the musique concrète in 1948. Among the famous contemporary artists include Jean-Michel Jarre, Heldon, Air, Daft Punk, Justice and M83.

History

Phonautograph (1857)

The earliest known sound recording device was the phonautograph, patented in 1857 by Édouard-Léon Scott de Martinville.

Ondes Martenot (1928)

In 1928, the Ondes Martenot was invented by Maurice Martenot, who debuted it in Paris. This electronic musical instrument was most famously used in the Turangalîla-Symphonie by Olivier Messiaen as well as other works by him. The Ondes Martenot was also used by other composers such as Andre Jolivet, Pierre Boulez, Arthur Honegger, Charles Koechlin, Darius Milhaud, Gilles Tremblay and Edgard Varèse.

Musique concrète (1948)

In 1942, the French composer and theoretician Pierre Schaeffer, began his exploration of radiophony when he joined Jacques Copeau and his pupils in the foundation of the Studio d'Essai de la Radiodiffusion Nationale. His work laid the foundations of the Musique concrète. This technique involved editing together recorded fragments of natural and industrial sounds. The first pieces of musique concrète in Paris were assembled by him, who went on to collaborate with Pierre Henry.

On 5 October 1948, Radiodiffusion Française (RDF) broadcast composer Pierre Schaeffer's Etude aux chemins de fer. This was the first "movement" of Cinq études de bruits, and marked the beginning of studio realizations and musique concrète (or acousmatic art). Schaeffer employed a disk-cutting lathe, four turntables, a four-channel mixer, filters, an echo chamber, and a mobile recording unit. Not long after this, Henry began collaborating with Schaeffer, a partnership that would have profound and lasting effects on the direction of electronic music. Another associate of Schaeffer, Edgard Varèse, began work on Déserts, a work for chamber orchestra and tape. The tape parts were created at Pierre Schaeffer's studio, and were later revised at Columbia University.

In 1950, Schaeffer gave the first public (non-broadcast) concert of musique concrète at the Ecole Normale de Musique de Paris. "Schaeffer used a PA system, several turntables, and mixers. Later that same year, Pierre Henry collaborated with Schaeffer on Symphonie pour un homme seul (1950) the first major work of musique concrete. In Paris in 1951, in what was to become an important worldwide trend, RTF established the first studio for the production of electronic music. Also in 1951, Schaeffer and Henry produced an opera, Orpheus, for concrete sounds and voices.

I.R.C.A.M. (1975)

In 1970, the President of France Georges Pompidou asked the composer Pierre Boulez to found an institution for research in new forms of music. The Institut de Recherche et Coordination Acoustique/Musique was created under his direction. Since then, IRCAM has been an avant-garde institute for science about music, sound and electro-acoustical art music in France.

Early electronic and space music (1970s)
In 1969, La Cage/Erosmachine was a very early electronic music work by Jean-Michel Jarre who became famous worldwide with the album Oxygene in 1976. Among other experimental electronic music we can cite Igor Wakhevitch with Hathor (1973) and François de Roubaix for the soundtrack of the Jacques-Yves Cousteau film Antartique (1974). "Space music" and "space disco" became popular with Space, Magic Fly (1977); Space Art, Onyx (1977); Cerrone, Supernature (1977); Droïds, The Force (1977) and Bernard Fevre aka Black Devil Disco Club (1975-1978). Following those and in the late 70s and early 80s other notable French electronic music acts were Philippe Laurent aka Hot Bip (Industrieuse, 1979) and René Roussel with Caramel (1980).

French Touch (1990)

Following precursors Jean-Michel Jarre and Cerrone, many French electronic artists have gained worldwide recognition under the name of "French Touch", especially Daft Punk, David Guetta, M83, Justice and Air.

Artists

 20syl
 Air
 André Jolivet
 B.B.E.
 Birdy Nam Nam
 Bob Sinclar
 Breakbot
 C2C
 Caravan Palace
 Carpenter Brut
 Cassius
 Cerrone
 Daft Punk
 Danger
 David Guetta
 David Vendetta
 DJ Snake
 Edgard Varèse
 Etienne de Crecy
 French 79
 Galleon
 Gérard Grisey
 Gesaffelstein
 Jacno
 Jackson and His Computerband
 Jean Barraqué
 Jean-Claude Risset
 Jean-Michel Jarre
 Jean-Jacques Perrey
 Justice
 Kavinsky
 Kid Francescoli
 Klingande
 Laurent Garnier
 Laurent Wolf
 M83
 Madeon
 Malaa
 Martin Solveig
 Michaël Lévinas
 Mirwais
 Miss Kittin
 Modjo
 Mr. Oizo 
 Olivier Messiaen
 Paradis
 Petit Biscuit
 Philippe Leroux
 Philippe Manoury
 Pierre Boulez
 Pierre Henry
 Pierre Schaeffer
 Rinôçérôse
 Rone
 Sebastian
 Sébastien Tellier
 Space
 Space Art
 Stéphane Pompougnac
 Tchami
 Télépopmusik
 The Supermen Lovers
 Tristan Murail
 Uppermost
 Vitalic
 Yuksek

See also
 French touch
 French music
 Electronic music

References

Bibliography
 
 .
 .